Hotel California  is a 2013 Malayalam comedy caper film written by Anoop Menon and directed by newcomer Aji John. It stars Jayasurya, Anoop Menon, Saiju Kurup, Shankar, Honey Rose, Maria Roy and Aparna Nair. The film is produced by Josemon Simon under the banner of Jairaj Films and features music composed by Shaan Rahman, whilst cinematography is handled by Jithu Damodar and is edited by Xian. The film's title is inspired by the famous song of the same name by Eagles.

Plot
The film begins with the City Police Commissioner Bharath Chandran jumping over the compound wall of a house who is having an affair with house owner's wife. The house owner confronts commissioner and beats and breaks his arm. It then shifts to a man at a friend's house asking where his friend and a don named Jimmy is, as there is work for him to do for the man. He reveals his work is to transport the counterfeit DVD of the upcoming releasing movie Hotel California and in which Jimmy has to transport it through the airport safely. It shifts to Kamala Nambiar a dancer practicing dance receives a call informing that what she ordered is ready (It is not revealed what she ordered to audiences). It once again shifts to Aby Mathew a lusting married middle aged man, who contacts a pimp to have sex with a television actress named Swapna Joseph who agrees to have sex with him for a large sum of money. Then Sasi Pillai is shown talking about a hot topic for news reporting about the don named Airport Jimmy. In which it shifts to the scene of Airport Jimmy in high class bar.

Cast

Jayasurya as Sulfur Jimmy aka Airport Jimmy
Anoop Menon as Superstar Prem Sagar
Honey Rose as Swapna Joseph
Saiju Kurup as Tarun Singh Deol & Rafeeq Kunjahammed (double role)
Nikhil as Rafeeq Ahammed
Maria Roy as Kamala Nambiar
Shankar as Aby Mathew
Joju George as Bharath Chandran IPS
P. Balachandran as Sasi Pillai
Nandhu
Krishna as Rashid
Sruthi Lakshmi as Linda Tharakan
Thesni Khan as Sherly
Sadiq as Ali 
Aparna Nair as Deepa Pillai 
Babu Namboothiri as Koshi
Manikuttan as Sharat
Sukumari as Rafeeq's mother
Sudheesh as Bavutty
Narayanankutty as Police Officer 
Nobi as Benny
Krishna Praba
Deepak Nair as Jiyad
Deepu Parassala
Kavitha Nair
Romanch as Director Linguswamy
Shibu Laban as Shibu
Arun
Kani Kusruti in Guest Role
Aji John as John

Production

Development
The combination of Anoop Menon and Jayasurya was joined again for the film named Pushpakavimaanam, which is scripted by Anoop. The film was announced after the duo's Beautiful, and was supposed to be directed by V.K. Prakash. Prakash was initially chosen to direct the film after the 2011 film Beautiful, in which the cinematography was chosen to be by Jomon T. John who had earlier done the cinematography for the film Beautiful with the same duo. The director V.K. Prakash felt that such a big film wouldn't begun so soon, thus Anoop Menon bringing forth the script of Trivandrum Lodge for the director to start. With the director opting to helm Trivandrum Lodge, Aji John was now chosen to direct Pushpakavimaanam. The film was renamed to Hotel California after the famous Eagles song "Hotel California". The film has Aji John and Anoop Menon duo joining after Namukku Paarkaan which got mixed responses in the box office.

Anoop Menon who helms the script of the movie says that the original song has made name touching the hearts of generations. He finds logic to turn the title of the movie to Hotel California as it too is for all generations who are ready to enjoy freedom.

Casting
Jayasurya and Anoop Menon were already announced but many actors had been considered for the female lead roles and supporting roles in the film.  Roma had opted out the role from Hotel California.

Filming
The shoot of the film had begun on 3 January 2013. The flight scenes of the movie was announced to be shot at the majestic sets of Ramoji Film City, Hyderabad. Following, the movie will have locations at Dubai and Colombo too. The director of cinematography is Jithu Damodar, who had earlier worked with Jayasurya and Anoop Menon duo in the film David and Goliath directed by Rajeev Nath. Jithu Damodar has shot the film with the Red Epic and Mysterium X Digital Cameras. The production designer is Sajith Krishna, the production controller is Badhusha who has worked in films such Karmayodha and Kandahar directed by Major Ravi. Art Direction is by Arkan Kollam.
The producers of the film had already set aside 2.5 million just for the shots inside aeroplanes and in airports. ₹60,000 was spent an hour for shooting in aeroplanes. Not many Malayalam films have been shot inside aeroplanes due to the formalities and the heavy expenses involved. The film's airport scenes in Kerala were shot in Cochin International Airport. The makers had set aside an extra 2.5 million for the shoot, since they will require five to six days of shoot; six to seven hours a day. The crew had earlier checked out the aeroplane set at the Ramoji Film City, but what the crew were looking for were something bigger. The film's story unfolds in the business class of the plane.

Soundtrack 

 01 -  Ee Raavin -  Shaan Rahman
 02 -  Manju Theerum -  Shaan Rahman
 03 -  Hotel California -  Shaan Rahman

Release
The film was released on 3 May 2013 and was an Average hit at the box office.

Reception

Metromatinee.com said that "Hotel California is for those who wants loads of fun and laughter and don't care about logic or reason, this surely is the one."

Indiaglitz.com said that "Hotel California is an enjoyable madcap comic caper with adequate frenzied moments to keep you in your seats. Taking clues from their previous hit 'Trivandrum Lodge', mixing it with aces of  ' Ramjirao speaking ', 'Delly Belly' and 'Tere bin laden', the movie has plenty of assured laughs." They also praised performance by all the actors, the direction, cinematography, art direction, music, and editing

Entertainment.oneindia.in  gave 3.0/5 rating and wrote that, "Overall, Hotel California is a good comedy entertainer. If you are lover of comedy films, don't miss to watch it."

References

Times of India report

External links
 

2010s Malayalam-language films
Films shot in Kochi
Films shot at Ramoji Film City
Films shot in Dubai
Films shot in Sri Lanka
Films scored by Shaan Rahman
Films directed by Aji John